Alfredo Far (born 25 May 1972) is a Panamanian former wrestler who competed in the 1996 Summer Olympics.

References

External links
 

1972 births
Living people
Panamanian male sport wrestlers
Olympic wrestlers of Panama
Wrestlers at the 1996 Summer Olympics
20th-century Panamanian people
21st-century Panamanian people